Free to Move is a 1996 reggae album by the group Israel Vibration. The album spent three weeks on the Billboard Reggae Albums chart, peaking at #14 on September 14, 1996.

Track listing

References 

1996 albums
Israel Vibration albums